Shell integration (the shell method in integral calculus) is a method for calculating the volume of a solid of revolution, when integrating along an axis perpendicular to the axis of revolution. This is in contrast to disc integration which integrates along the axis parallel to the axis of revolution.

Definition

The shell method goes as follows: Consider a volume in three dimensions obtained by rotating a cross-section in the -plane around the -axis. Suppose the cross-section is defined by the graph of the positive function  on the interval . Then the formula for the volume will be:

If the function is of the  coordinate and the axis of rotation is the -axis then the formula becomes:

If the function is rotating around the line  then the formula becomes:

 
and for rotations around  it becomes 

The formula is derived by computing the double integral in polar coordinates.

Example

Consider the volume, depicted below, whose cross section on the interval [1, 2] is defined by:

In the case of disc integration we would need to solve for  given  and because the volume is hollow in the middle we would find two functions, one that defined the inner solid and one that defined the outer solid. After integrating these two functions with the disk method we would subtract them to yield the desired volume.

With the shell method all we need is the following formula:

By expanding the polynomial the integral becomes very simple. In the end we find the volume is  cubic units.

See also
Solid of revolution
Disc integration

References

Frank Ayres, Elliott Mendelson. Schaum's Outlines: Calculus. McGraw-Hill Professional 2008, . pp. 244–248

Integral calculus